The Intersection: Discovery (stylized in all caps) is the second extended play by South Korean boy group BDC and the second installment from their The Intersection trilogy. It was released on March 8, 2021 by Brand New Music and distributed by Kakao Entertainment. The physical version of the EP is available in two versions: "Reality" and "Dreaming". The EP itself consists of five tracks, including the lead single, "Moon Rider" and its instrumental.

Background and release 
On February 22, 2021, Brand New Music announced with a teaser image that BDC would make a comeback with a new album in two weeks. 

On February 24-26, Brand New Music released the concept photos consecutively. Three days later, on March 1, they released the tracklist, which revealed "Moon Rider" as the lead single. On March 2, the lyric teaser photo for "Moon Rider" was released. On March 3, they released the first music video teaser for "Moon Rider". The next day, on March 4, the preview video for the EP was revealed. On March 5, they released the second music video teaser for "Moon Rider".

Then, on March 8, the album was released alongside the music video for "Moon Rider".

Promotion 
On March 7, 2021, BDC held a private showcase at Starfield COEX Mall.

They promoted the single "Moon Rider" at Mnet's M Countdown, KBS2's Music Bank, MBC's Show! Music Core, SBS's Inkigayo, SBS MTV's The Show, MBC M's Show Champion, and Arirang TV's Simply K-Pop.

On April 10, 2021, BDC held a special fan meeting at the seventh floor of CGV Hongdae.

Track listing

Charts

Release history

References 

2021 EPs
BDC (group) albums
Korean-language EPs